Anti-Igbo sentiment (also known as Igbophobia) encompasses a range of negative attitudes and feelings toward the Igbo people of south eastern Nigeria. Igbophobia is observable in critical and hostile behaviour such as political and religious discrimination and violence towards Igbos.

Pre-civil war sentiments
During the beginning years of Nigeria's colonial independence, the Igbo people increasingly came to be perceived as a disproportionately-favoured ethnic group with affluence and multi-regionalistic opportunity due to the Igbo being employed within colonial Nigeria by the colonial authorities and in the public sector in regions throughout the country. This aroused the ire of others toward the Igbo.

This was exacerbated by the short-lived government of General Johnson Aguiyi-Ironsi, whose military junta consisted mostly of Igbo and who abolished the federated regions; this led to his assassination in a counter-coup led primarily by Northern participants. It was followed by the massacre of thousands of Igbo in pogroms in the Northern region, which drove millions of Igbos to their homeland in Eastern Nigeria; ethnic relations deteriorated rapidly, and a separate republic of Biafra was declared in 1967, leading to the Biafran War.

Anti-Igbo pogrom

The 1966 anti-Igbo pogrom was a series of massacres directed at Igbo and other people of southern Nigerian origin living in northern Nigeria starting in May 1966 and reaching a peak after 29 September 1966. During this period 30,000-50,000 Igbo civilians were murdered throughout northern Nigeria by Hausa–Fulani soldiers and civilians who sought revenge for the 1966 Nigerian coup d'état, carried out by six Majors and three Captains of Southern Nigerian extraction, and resulted in the deaths of 11 Nigerian politicians and army officers of Hausa, Fulani, Itsekiri and Yoruba origin. These events led to the Nigerian counter coup and eventually the secession of the eastern Nigerian region and the declaration of the Republic of Biafra, which ultimately led to the Nigeria-Biafra war. The 1966 massacres of southern Nigerians have been described as a holocaust by some authors and have variously been described as riots, pogroms or genocide.

Nigerian Civil War

The Republic of Biafra was a secessionist state in eastern Nigeria that existed from 30 May 1967 to January 1970. It took its name from the Bight of Biafra, the Atlantic bay to its south. The inhabitants were mostly the Igbo people who led the secession due to economic, ethnic, cultural and religious tensions among the various peoples of Nigeria. Other ethnic groups that constituted the republic were the Efik, Ibibio, Annang, Ejagham, Eket, Ibeno and the Ijaw, among others.

Outside Nigeria
On August 2019, a Yoruba supremacist who immigrated to the United Kingdom from Nigeria was arrested by British police for making YouTube videos that contained violent hate speech towards the Igbo people, and he was later sentenced to prison in April 2022.
In The US, recent tensions between Native Black Americans and Southern Nigerian immigrants have contributed the stereotype of a general distaste by Africans of African-Americans. Igbo Americans tend to concentrate in areas controlled by English Americans,  (the minority responsible for the enslavement and oppression of African-Americans), like Northern Virginia and Washington state and tend to work in fields like the medical field, military and in prisons, where they generally work alongside conservative Whites. As a result, African-Americans in Northern Virginia do not generally regard Igbos as a brotherly tribe in the way that they have historically looked at every other Black, North African, or Caribbean ethnic group for centuries. This is in spite of the fact that African-Americans in these regions are disproportionately of Southern Nigerian descent and Igbo immigrants, due to high admixture with White slavers, are often harder to distinguish from African-Americans than other Black ethnic groups.

Anti-Igbo Sentiments today
Peter Obi's emergence as the labour party candidate prompted igbophobic sentiments and hatred against the Igbo people. During his campaign in 2022, there were phobic comments that Igbos are trying to take over Nigeria and divide the country in order to create Biafra. Even after his multiple interviews/ debate which was uncommon for very popular presidential candidates in recent times within Nigerian politics his candidacy was at times dismissed as Igbo people yearning for an Igbo presidency. During this election the singer, Brymo made hateful comments against the Igbo people, at first he insinuated that Igbo people are not ready for the presidency and that Peter Obi should stick to organizing the eastern region from which he hails. A few days after this hateful comment he released another Igbophobic comment while replying to a now-deleted tweet saying "Fuck The Ndi Igbo !! .. To Hell With It!!" this prompted an online petition on change.org to the All Africa Music Award against his nomination for Song Writer of the Year. He released an apology but left hateful comments on his social media account. These hateful comments by Brymo got a lot of support from ethnic nationalists who were often APC supporters. 
Anti-Igbo sentiments during the 2023 Nigerian elections were common from the disenfranchisement of Igbo people during the PVC collections to an alleged bigoted statement against Igbo people in Lagos by the State Resident Electoral Commissioner, Olusegun Agbaje. These sentiments became violent and resulted in blockades and threats against Igbo people from accessing the businesses they owned. The violence stretched into the reoccurring burning of Igbo businesses in Lagos during elections. 
The sentiments peaked during the gubernatorial elections within the state of Lagos. Weeks leading up to the gubernatorial elections a candidate by the name of Gbadebo Rhodes-Vivour who is part Yoruba (from his father's side) and part Igbo (from his mother's side) had anti-Igbo attacks directed at him. His identity came into question and these attacks weren't just personal in terms of the fact that he was part Igbo and has an Igbo wife. These attacks were directed at the broader Igbo ethnicity within Lagos and ethnic nationalists questioned why anybody who is Igbo should become a governor within the western states in Nigeria. On the day of the election, Igbo people were threatened and beaten in order to prevent them from voting. These attacks weren't just relegated to Igbo people but to anyone presumed to look like an Igbo person. As a result Igbo people and anybody presumed to look like an Igbo person were being pointed at by people who knew them in other for them to be attacked. Anti-Igbo sentiments, comments, and adverts flooded different social media platforms during this gubernatorial election. These sentiments lasted right into the next day (Sunday) which was also the day Igbos were attacked at Abule ado in Lagos state.

See also
 Radio Nigeria Kaduna

References

 
Igbo society
Discrimination in Nigeria
Racism